Carter's Chord was an American country music group composed of sisters Becky Scott, Emily Fortney, and Joanna Ott, all of whom are singer-songwriters and vocalists. They are also the three daughters of Barny and Carter Roberston, both of whom played in Waylon Jennings' road band The Waylors in the 1970s; Emily Fortney is also married to Marc "Butter" Fortney of Trailer Choir, another country music group.

After several years of performing locally, the trio was signed in 2006 to Show Dog Nashville (now Show Dog-Universal Music), a record label owned by country singer Toby Keith. Their debut single, "Young Love", reached the Billboard Hot Country Songs charts, as did its followup "Different Breed." Both are included on the group's debut album, which was issued to digital retailers in June 2008.

Biography
Becky, Emily and Joanna Robertson were raised in a musically inclined household in southern California. Their parents—keyboardist and producer Barny Robertson, and vocalist Carter Robertson—were both members of Waylon Jennings' road band The Waylors in the 1970s. Having performed together at their home from an early age, the three sisters made their recording debut on Jennings' 1998 album Cowboys, Sisters, Rascals & Dirt, which their father produced. The sisters would also charge for the shows which they performed at home; among the artists who paid to see them at their house included Jennings and members of The Crickets.

Later on, the three sisters moved to Nashville, Tennessee, where they began honing their singing and songwriting skills. Eventually, they were discovered by Toby Keith; after the trio held a showcase on February 14, 2006, Keith signed them to his own Show Dog Nashville label. The group's first release was a recording of the Christmas standard "O come, O come, Emmanuel", which was placed into rotation on the television network CMT. They also recorded the song "Song of Blue" on the soundtrack to the 2008 film Beer for My Horses, in which Keith starred.

"Young Love", their debut single, was released to radio in January 2008, and entered the Billboard Hot Country Songs charts. A second single, "Different Breed", was released to radio in April 2008. In addition, Carter's Chord released its debut album to digital retailers in June 2008.

"You Knock Me Out" was released to radio in January 2010 as the trio's third single, but it failed to chart. Their fourth single, "A Little Less Comfortable", was released a year later in January 2011. This song also failed to chart.

Personal lives
Joanna married Mark Ott in mid-2009. Emily married Marc "Butter" Fortney of Trailer Choir, another act on the Show Dog-Universal label, in September 2010. Becky got engaged to longtime boyfriend, music producer Jeremiah Scott on August 23, 2011, and married him on April 21, 2012.

In March 2014, Ott released a solo EP called Machinery.

Discography

Extended plays

Singles

Music videos

References

External links

Country music groups from Tennessee
Sibling musical trios
Musical groups from Nashville, Tennessee
Vocal trios
Musical groups established in 2006
Show Dog-Universal Music artists